Action Pack may refer to:

 Action Pack (TV programming block), a syndicated television programming block by Universal Television
 Action Pack, a component of Ruby on Rails
 Action Pack (TV series), a children's streaming series for Netflix